The Uí Néill (meaning "descendants of Niall") are Irish dynasties who claim descent from Niall Noígíallach (Niall of the Nine Hostages), a historical King of Tara who died c. 405. They are generally divided into the Northern and Southern Uí Néill.

Branches
The founders of the Uí Néill branches are the alleged sons of Niall Noigiallach, seven in all:

The Northern Uí Néill branch:
 Conall Gulban, ancestor of the Cenél Conaill dynasty,
 Eógan, ancestor of the Cenél nEógain dynasty.

The Southern Uí Néill branch:
 Éndae, ancestor of the Cenél nÉndai,
 Coirpre, ancestor of the Cenél Coirpri dynasty,
 Lóegaire, ancestor of the Cenél Lóegaire dynasty,
 Conall Cremthainne, ancestor of the Clann Cholmáin and Síl nÁedo Sláine,
 Fiachu, ancestor of the Cenél Fiachach.

All these men were in their lifetime known as members of Connachta dynasty, or as "the sons of Niall." The term Uí Néill did not, by its very nature, come into use until the time of Niall's grandsons and great-grandsons.

Dynasties descended from the Uí Néill, such as the Cenél Conaill  and Cenél nEógain, held power in Ulster until their defeat in the Nine Years War in 1603. Many of the heads of the families left for Catholic Europe in 1607, an event known as the Flight of the Earls.

Uí Néill family tree
Bold indicates a supposed High King of Ireland.

See also
 Gaelic nobility of Ireland
 Haplogroup R1b-M222 (Y-DNA)
 Irish royal families

References

Bibliography
 .
 
 .
 .
 .

External links
 Matching Niall Nóigiallach at Family Tree DNA
 R-M222 Haplogroup Project at Family Tree DNA

 
Ancient Ireland
Gaelic-Irish nations and dynasties
Medieval Ireland